Williams Mountains Highpoint, elevation , is a mountain in White River National Forest in the U.S. state of Colorado. It is the highest peak in the Williams Mountains, an offshoot of the Sawatch Range. The peak is within the Hunter–Fryingpan Wilderness.

References

White River National Forest
Mountains of Pitkin County, Colorado